Abilene (also titled Shadows of the Past) is a 1999 American drama film written and directed by Joe Camp III and starring Ernest Borgnine.

Cast
Ernest Borgnine as Hotis Brown
Kim Hunter as Emmeline Brown
James Morrison as Bernie
Wendell Pierce as Reverend Tillis
Park Overall as Betty
Adrian Richard as Mavis
Alan North as Jarvisn Brown
Zoaunne LeRoy as Shirley
Mary Jo Catlett as Etta
Rance Howard as Arliss

References

External links
 

American drama films
1999 drama films
1990s English-language films
1990s American films